Bigby Road Bridge railway station served the town of Brigg, North Lincolnshire, England, from 1852 to 1882 on the Great Grimsby and Sheffield Junction Railway.

History 
The station was opened on 1 March 1852 by the Manchester, Sheffield and Lincolnshire Railway. It was only open on Thursdays, although a special train ran on Wednesday 17 October 1855, which served a Bazaar. It closed in August 1882.

References 

Disused railway stations in the Borough of North Lincolnshire
Railway stations in Great Britain opened in 1852
Railway stations in Great Britain closed in 1882
1852 establishments in England
1882 disestablishments in England